Louis Auguste Gressier (12 May 1897 – 14 January 1959) was a French rower who competed in the 1924 Summer Olympics. He won the silver medal in the men's coxed four event.

References

External links
 Profile

1897 births
1959 deaths
French male rowers
Olympic silver medalists for France
Olympic rowers of France
Rowers at the 1924 Summer Olympics
Olympic medalists in rowing
Medalists at the 1924 Summer Olympics
20th-century French people